Westwood High School Senior (also known as Westwood Senior High School) is an English language high school located in Hudson, Quebec. The school is part of the Lester B. Pearson School Board offering secondary III, IV, and V education along with its partner Westwood High School Junior Campus which offers secondary I and II education.

Approximately 90% of graduates continue their education at CEGEP and vocational schools.

Location
Westwood Senior High School is located in the town of Hudson, Quebec of the Montérégie administrative region within the Greater Montreal metropolitan area of Quebec – roughly 24 km west of Montreal Island.

History
Immigrant families from Cumberland, England first began to settle on this land in the early 1800s. Attracted by the rolling hills, fertile lands for farming, and proximity to the Ottawa River, families put down their roots along the Lake of Two Mountains. Beginning construction in 1919 and officially opening in February 1920, Westwood Senior High School, previously Hudson High School, is a school with a long history.

Renovations first began when it became necessary to erect a fence in order to prevent cattle from wandering onto the yard during lunch. Since then, the population of Hudson and surrounding towns has continued to grow, leading to major renovations and additions in 1939, 1948–49, 1961–62, and in 1987-88.

Due mainly to population growth, Hudson High School was renamed Westwood Senior High School on July 1, 2003. Divided into two campuses, Westwood Senior High School comprises secondary III, IV, and V students while the smaller campus Westwood High School Junior Campus comprises secondary I and II students.

Programs and activities 
Westwood Senior High School offers a variety of co-curricular programs which includes athletics, drama, music, art, cultural activities, debating, student government, community service, tutoring, and more.

Clubs available to students include Journalism, Library Club, Art Club, Drama Club, Outdoors Club, Model UN, Sisterhood (a club that aims to bring together and empower girls through a safe community on campus), Brotherhood (a club that aims to improve the image that high school boys have acquired by engaging in positive school activities), Ceramics, Corporate Pitch (a club responsible for raising funds towards Bridge to Burundi), and Yearbook.

Sport activities are available to students during the fall season: soccer, cross country running, volleyball, and softball; the winter season: basketball, curling, cross-country skiing, and wrestling; and the spring season: rugby, girls' touch football, lacrosse, and outdoor track and field.

A Word-Study Program is offered which allows students to work outside of school one day per week in order to practice a skill or trade which may interest them as a future career. This course counts for four credits, and students are expected to continue to take a full course load.

Secondary V students have the opportunity to participate in the International Development Project which consists of a 2-3 week cultural exchange in a Central or South American country. The aim of this project is to expose students to global issues and encourage community involvement as well as fostering respect, responsibility, cooperation, and accountability.

Bridge to Burundi
The Bridge to Burundi project was started in October 2009 by students who were touched by a presentation given by one of the teachers, native Burundian Jean-Claude Manirakiza, about the state of education in his home country following the Burundian genocides. The students set out on the process of building an elementary school in Rwoga, Burundi and after 8 months opened the school to 60 1st graders. The project has continued to grow and now offers free education and supplies to more than 400 students, a medical center, a convenience store, a flour mill, solar panels, and drinkable water to the village.

Funds for the project have been raised through bake sales, talent shows, dances, corporate sponsors, and in 2015 the students of Westwood Senior High School published their first children's book "Bakuru and the School on the Hill"

The project has been officially endorsed by Lt.-General Roméo Dallaire, a former UN Commander; the Burundi government; Greg Mortensen (internationally-bestselling author of Three Cups of Tea); Primus Online, Aeroplan, and Facebook Canada. The project also won an award at the 2010 Quebec Entrepreneurship Contest.

Alumni
 Jack Layton (Hudson High School)
 Vanessa Lengies (Hudson High School)
 Amanda Walsh (Hudson High School)

References

High schools in Quebec